Rafif al-Yasiri, better known as Barbie of Iraq (19 December 1985 – 16 August 2018), was an Iraqi plastic surgeon and conductor of national programs specializing in medical affairs for women. In March 2018, she was appointed Goodwill Ambassador of the French Organization for Human Rights and Peace. She had the center for plastic surgery and laser operations in the Al-Jadriya area in Baghdad.

Death 
Al-Yasiri died on 16 August 2018 at Sheikh Zayed Hospital, One of the doctors at the hospital stated that Rafif was dead when she had arrived at Sheikh Zayed Hospital.
According to the Interior Minister, she died of a drug overdose. However, the circumstances are still mysterious.

References

1985 births
2018 deaths
21st-century Iraqi physicians
Iraqi television personalities
Iraqi plastic surgeons
Physicians from Baghdad
Drug-related deaths in Iraq